"Don't Stop the Madness" is a song by Dutch DJs Hardwell and W&W. It features rapper Fatman Scoop. It is the third single from Hardwell's 2015 debut studio album United We Are.

Background 
Hardwell performed the song at Tomorrowland in July 2014.

Track listing

Charts

References 

2015 songs
2015 singles
Hardwell songs
Songs written by Fatman Scoop
Songs written by Hardwell